Hayes Lane is a football stadium in Bromley, Greater London, England. Located between Bromley town centre and Hayes, it is the home of Bromley F.C., and also used by Cray Wanderers and Crystal Palace Women.

The current capacity of the ground is 5,000, of which 1,300 is seated and 2,500 covered.

History
Bromley moved to Hayes Lane in 1938 from their previous ground, also on the same road. It initially featured a 2,500-seat stand on one side of the pitch, with the remainder of the pitch surrounded by banking. The ground was opened by Stanley Rous on 3 September 1938, with Walthamstow Avenue winning 6–1. The record attendance at the ground of 10,798 was set on 24 September 1948 for a friendly game between Bromley and a Nigeria XI. Floodlights were installed in 1960, and were formally switched on for a game between Japan and an Isthmian League XI on 27 September.

The banking was later replaced by concrete terracing, with both ends of the pitch later covered. The original stand burned down in October 1992, and was replaced by a much smaller 320-seat stand, which was opened the following year. Seats obtained from the London Aquatics Centre were installed behind one goal to meet ground grading regulations after promotion to the National League.

In April 2017, the club announced that work would begin on construction of a 1,450-seat stand at the south end of the ground, and that the playing surface would be converted from grass to 3G. The stand was officially opened on 20 July 2019 and named in honour of former club chairman Glyn Beverly.

International football
In June 2018, Hayes Lane hosted five games at the 2018 ConIFA World Football Cup

References

Bromley F.C.
Football venues in England
Sports venues in London
CONIFA World Football Cup stadiums
Sports venues completed in 1938
1938 establishments in England
Crystal Palace F.C. (Women)